The Escorial Taktikon (other spellings: Escurial Taktikon, Escorial Tacticon, Escurial Tacticon), also known as the Taktikon Oikonomides after Nicolas Oikonomides who first edited it, is a list of Byzantine offices, dignities, and titles composed in Constantinople during the 970s (971–975 or 975–979). The list contains, among many entries, the commanders (strategoi) of the Byzantine Empire's eastern frontier during the Byzantine-Arab Wars, as well as a series of judicial offices.

References

Sources

970s in the Byzantine Empire
10th-century books
Byzantine literature
Handbooks and manuals
10th century in the Byzantine Empire